Theodor Bergmann (May 21, 1850 in Sailauf – March 23, 1931 in Gaggenau) was a German businessman and industrialist best remembered for the various revolutionary firearms his companies released. Like many entrepreneurs of the era, his activities centered on bicycles, and the nascent automobile. Armament was not Bergmann's primary focus, but the one he was most attracted to, which was the reason most of his pistols were manufactured under license once they were created. He is famous for creating automatic pistols, and their ammunition.

Theodor Bergmann sold his automobile activity to Carl Benz in 1910.

A new Bergmann model pistol was patented every year:

Bergmann 1893
Bergmann 1894
Bergmann 1895
Bergmann 1896
Bergmann 1897 a.k.a. Bergmann Pieper
Bergmann 1898
Bergmann 1899
Bergmann 1901 a.k.a. Bergmann Simplex
Bergmann Mars
Bergmann 1905
Bergmann 1908 a.k.a. Bergmann–Bayard 1908
Bergmann 1910 a.k.a. Bergmann–Bayard 1910
Bergmann 1910/21 a.k.a. Bergmann–Bayard 1910/21

Bergmann designed the Bergmann MG15 nA Gun a LMG using a locking system he patented in 1901. It was used until World War II as the MG 15 machine gun

In 1915, the German Rifle Testing Commission at Spandau decided to develop a new weapon for trench warfare. The original intention had been to modify existing semi-automatic pistols, specifically the Luger and C96 Mauser. However, the mechanisms of these pistols were not suited to the stresses of full automatic fire, let alone the dirt and debris of the typical battlefield. In addition these light weight weapons were difficult to control in full automatic fire. Based upon this, the Commission determined that a completely new kind of weapon was needed.

Hugo Schmeisser, working for the Bergmann Waffenfabrik, was part of a team that designed a new type of weapon to fulfill the requirements, which was designated the MP18 or Maschinenpistole 18/I.

Theodor Bergmann's company still exists today as a plastics manufacturer.

Bibliography
 Götz, Hans Dieter, German Military Rifles and Machine Pistols, 1871-1945, Schiffer Publishing, Ltd. West Chester, Pennsylvania, 1990. 
 Schroeder, Joseph J., "Theodor Bergmann, ein Berühmter Name aus den Anfangszeiten der Selbstlader Pistolen" in Waffen Digest '83, Verlag Stocker-Schmid AG/Motorbuch Verlag, Zurich, 1982
 Smith, W.H.B., Small Arms of the World: The Basic Manual of Military Small Arms, Harrisburg, Pa. : Stackpole Books, 1955. 
 Günter Wollert; Reiner Lidschun; Wilfried Kopenhagen, Illustrierte Enzyklopädie der Schützenwaffen aus aller Welt : Schützenwaffen heute (1945-1985), Berlin : Militärverlag der Deutschen Demokratischen Republik, 1988. 
 Clinton Ezell, Edward, Small Arms of the World, Eleventh Edition, Arms & Armour Press, London, 1977
 Deutsches Waffen Journal
 Visier
 Schweizer Waffen Magazin
 Internationales Waffen Magazin
 Cibles
 AMI
 Gazette des Armes
 Action Guns
 Guns & Ammo
 American Handgunner
 SWAT Magazine
 Diana Armi
 Armi & Tiro

Notes

External links
Theodor Bergmann in German
Guns & Ammo, May 2003 Bergmann pistols
Pieper Belgium licensed manufacturer of Bergmann pistol under the brand Bergmann-Bayard.
9mm Largo, 9mm Bergmann
MG15
MP 18.1 Video, Informations and Pictures
A Bergmann MP 18 built in Tsing Tao, China in 1927
Historic Arms
Springfield Armory's Villar Perosa

1850 births
1931 deaths
19th-century German inventors
People from the Kingdom of Bavaria
20th-century German inventors